Joyce E. Chaplin (born July 28, 1960, in Antioch, California) is an American historian and academic known for her writing and research on early American history, environmental history, and intellectual history. She is the James Duncan Phillips Professor of Early American History at Harvard University. She was a Guggenheim Fellow and American Academy of Arts and Sciences Fellow of 2019.  In 2020 she was elected to the American Philosophical Society. She is on Editorial Board of the Journal of the History of Ideas.

Life 
After receiving her BA from Northwestern University and her PhD from Johns Hopkins University in 1986, she taught at Vanderbilt University in Nashville for fourteen years (1986-2000). She became Professor of History at Harvard in 2000.

Selected works
 An Anxious Pursuit: Agricultural Innovation and Modernity in the Lower South, 1730-1815 Chapel Hill: University of North Carolina Press, 1993. , 
 Subject Matter: Technology, the Body, and Science on the Anglo-American Frontier, 1500-1676 Cambridge, Mass. : Harvard University Press, 2001. ,   
 The First Scientific American: Benjamin Franklin and the Pursuit of Genius New York : Basic Books, 2006. ,  
 Round About the Earth: Circumnavigation from Magellan to Orbit New York: Simon & Schuster, 2012. , 
 with Alison Bashford, The New Worlds of Thomas Robert Malthus: Re-reading the Principle of Population, Princeton : Princeton University Press, 2016. ,

References

External links 
 Faculty page at Harvard University
 http://heymancenter.org/people/joyce-chaplin/

Harvard University faculty
Johns Hopkins University alumni
1960 births
Living people
Members of the American Philosophical Society
Benjamin Franklin
Fellows of the American Academy of Arts and Sciences

Women historians
Vanderbilt University faculty